Paenitentiam agere ("Penance for sins") was the seventh encyclical made by Pope John XXIII, and was issued on 1 July 1962.  It calls on Christians to practice penance and considers the upcoming Second Vatican Council.

See also
List of encyclicals of Pope John XXIII

References

External links
 Source text from the Holy See.

Papal encyclicals
Works by Pope John XXIII
1962 documents
1962 in Christianity
July 1962 events